Goose Island, located in Lake Huron,  is positioned 3.25 miles from Brulee Point on the mainland. The island is within Clark Township, Mackinac County, in the U.S. state of Michigan. Goose Island is part of the Les Cheneaux Islands.

References

Islands of Lake Huron in Michigan
Islands of Mackinac County, Michigan